Heers Castle is a castle in Heers, Province of Limburg, Belgium.

It was built in the 13th century. Of its many owners, among the most notorious was Raes van Heers (1418–77), who was defeated and driven into exile by Charles the Bold at the Battle of Brustem in 1467. The castle, and the town of Heers, were laid waste by Charles's troops, although the castle was eventually repaired after Raes' death by his widow.

The family de Rivière d'Arschot lived here until  the 18th century, when Barbara, daughter and heiress of the last Count, Henri de Rivière d'Arschot, became abbess of Herkenrode Abbey; on her death in 1744, the family became extinct.

The castle has now (2010) again fallen into a derelict state.

External links
 History of the castle

See also
List of castles in Belgium

References

Castles in Belgium
Castles in Limburg (Belgium)